Joel Alberto Silva Estigarribia (born 13 January 1989) is a Paraguayan international footballer who plays as a goalkeeper.

Career
Born in Carapeguá, Silva has played for Guaraní, Luqueño and Deportes Tolima.

He made his international debut for Paraguay in 2011, and appeared at the 2009 FIFA U-20 World Cup where he was the team captain.

References

1989 births
Living people
People from Carapeguá
Paraguayan footballers
Paraguay international footballers
Club Guaraní players
Sportivo Luqueño players
Deportes Tolima footballers
Deportivo Capiatá players
Club Olimpia footballers
Paraguayan Primera División players
Categoría Primera A players
Association football goalkeepers
Paraguayan expatriate footballers
Paraguayan expatriate sportspeople in Colombia
Expatriate footballers in Colombia